Clepsis spectrana, the cyclamen tortrix, cabbage leafroller or straw-colored tortrix, is a moth of the family Tortricidae. It is found in Europe.

The wingspan is 16–22 mm. The color is very variable, but the ground  color of the forewing is often more or less brown. The wing usually has two dark spots at the costa; edge, the innermost is square and the outermost oval. Behind the outermost spot there is usually a small, round black spot. Paler individuals have clear, fine, brown crosslines. The hindwings are brownish-white. 

The moth flies in two generations from late April to September.

The larvae feed on various trees, shrubs and cabbage.

References

External links
 waarneming.nl .
 Lepidoptera of Belgium
 Cyclamen Tortrix at UKMoths

Clepsis
Moths described in 1830
Tortricidae of Europe